1,3-Difluoro-2-propanol is a metabolic poison which disrupts the citric acid cycle and is used as a rodenticide, similar to sodium fluoroacetate. It is the main ingredient (along with 1-chloro-3-fluoro-2-propanol) in the rodenticide product Gliftor which was widely used in the former USSR and still approved in China.

References 

Rodenticides
Fluorohydrins
Respiratory toxins